The Primera Divisió de Futsal is the premier  futsal league in Andorra. The league is played under UEFA rules and organized by Andorran Football Federation, currently consists of 10 teams.

Champions

See also
Primera Divisió
Andorran Football Federation

External links
Official website  
Futsalplanet 

Futsal competitions in Andorra
Andorra
1995 establishments in Andorra
Sports leagues established in 1995
Sports leagues in Andorra